Nils Johan Hugo Westermark (September 9, 1892 – January 24, 1980) was a Swedish sailor who competed in the 1912 Summer Olympics.  He later became a radiologist, and described the Westermark sign.

He was a crew member of the Swedish boat Sans Atout, which won the silver medal in the 8 metre class.

References

External links
profile

1892 births
1980 deaths
Swedish male sailors (sport)
Sailors at the 1912 Summer Olympics – 8 Metre
Olympic sailors of Sweden
Olympic silver medalists for Sweden
Olympic medalists in sailing
Medalists at the 1912 Summer Olympics